Vapi railway station (station code:- VAPI) is a railway station on the Western Railway network in the state of Gujarat. It is located in Vapi city. It is a major railway station in South Gujarat after .

Vapi is "A" category railway station of Mumbai WR railway division of Western Railway Zone. It is well connected by rail to all major cities of India. Some Passenger trains start from here.

Trains

Following trains start and terminate at Vapi railway station:

 09069 Vapi–Surat Passenger Special
 59040 Vapi–Virar Shuttle
 59045 Bandra Terminus–Vapi Passenger
 09072 Valsad–Vapi Passenger Special

See also
 Vapi

Notes

References

Railway stations in Valsad district
Mumbai WR railway division
Vapi